Show Me the Way may refer to:

Books
Show Me the Way, a 2004 collection of short stories by Jennifer Lauck

Music

Songs
"Show Me the Way" (Peter Frampton song), 1975
"Show Me the Way" (Styx song), 1990
"Show Me the Way" (Lead song), 2002
"Show Me the Way" (Earth, Wind & Fire song), 2005
"Show Me the Way" (The Cranberries song), 2012
"Show Me the Way", a song from the 2011 Alexandra Stan album Saxobeats
"Show Me the Way", a song written and recorded by Brian Cadd
"Show Me the Way", a song from the 2012 Billy Talent album Dead Silence
"Show Me the Way", a song from the 2008 Black Tide album Light from Above
"Show Me the Way", a 2017 song by Marco & Seba
"Show Me the Way", a song by Irving Berlin

See also
Show Me Your Way, a 1991 Glen Campbell album